Jacqueline Billet (born January 23, 1974) is an American former soccer player who played as a midfielder, making one appearance for the United States women's national team.

Career
In high school, Billet played for the Oakville Tigers, where she had a team record of 25 assists in a season and was an All-Metro player in 1991. In college, she played for the Wisconsin Badgers from 1992 to 1995, where she was a letter-winner. In total, she scored 26 goals and registered 20 assists. She was selected for the NSCAA All-Region first team in 1992, 1993, and 1994, as well as the third team in 1995. She was also included in the All-Big Ten Conference first team in 1994. In 1996, she was selected as part of the West Squad for the Umbro College All-Star Soccer Classic, and in 2008 was inducted into the Oakville High School Hall of Fame as a part of the school's 1991 women's championship-winning soccer team.

Billet made her only international appearance for the United States on August 16, 1992 in a friendly match against Norway, which finished as a 2–4 loss.

From 1997 to 2001, Billet served as an assistant coach at Illinois State Redbirds.

Career statistics

International

References

1974 births
Living people
Soccer players from Missouri
American women's soccer players
American women's soccer coaches
United States women's international soccer players
Women's association football midfielders
Wisconsin Badgers women's soccer players